WCXR (103.7 FM) is a radio station located in Lewisburg, Pennsylvania. It is a simulcast of 99.3 FM WZXR in Williamsport, Pennsylvania.  From 1986 to 1994, the call letters belonged to a classic rock station (now WMAL-FM) in Alexandria, Virginia broadcasting on 105.9 FM to the Washington, DC metro area. It is owned by Van A. Michael, through licensee Backyard Broadcasting of Pennsylvania LLC.

See also
 WZXR

External links

CXR
Radio stations established in 1990